Reich was a first-person shooter video game originally developed by Ignition Florida and since 2011 by UTV True Games and published by UTV Ignition Games.

Closing of Ignition Florida 
On November 3, 2010, Gamasutra reported that Ignition's Florida based studio had closed its doors, citing a rep from the studio that "We are continuing the Florida Studio’s project but refocusing it in the right direction. UTV Ignition will make an official news release regarding the studio soon." This was misunderstood by many prominent gaming sites like Kotaku and Joystiq that the game was cancelled.

Revival and UTV Ignition's consolidation 
On January 12, 2011, in a press release UTV Ignition Entertainment said that "it has consolidated its West and East Coast operations to a central office in Austin, Texas with on line micro transaction gaming studio, UTV True Games", later adding that "The company's highly-anticipated first-person-shooter, Reich, remains in development and is now being developed in Austin, where key personnel along with additional new hires will create a new internal development team."

Cancellation 
UTV Ignition's website has been shut down, suggesting the game has been cancelled.

Notes

References

External links 
 UTV Ignition Entertainment website

First-person shooters
Cancelled PlayStation 3 games
Cancelled Windows games
Cancelled Xbox 360 games
Multiplayer and single-player video games